An oral consonant is a consonant sound in speech that is made by allowing air to escape from the mouth, as opposed to the nose, as in a nasal consonant. To create an intended oral consonant sound, the entire mouth plays a role in modifying the air's passageway. This rapid modification of the air passageway using the tongue and lips makes changes to the waveform of the sound by compressing and expanding the air. In addition to the nose and mouth, the vocal cords and lungs also make a contribution to producing speech by controlling the volume (amplitude) and pitch (frequency) of the sound. The use of the vocal cords will also determine whether the consonant is voiced or voiceless.

See also
Nasal consonant
Manner of articulation
List of phonetics topics

References

External links

 
Manner of articulation